Antonio Loi (born 25 August 1996) is an Italian footballer who plays as an attacking midfielder for Arzachena.

Career
On 16 July 2016, he joined Modena.

On 23 July 2019, he signed with Serie D club Muravera.

References

External links

1996 births
Living people
Association football midfielders
Italian footballers
Italy youth international footballers
Cagliari Calcio players
A.C. Carpi players
A.C. Reggiana 1919 players
Modena F.C. players
FeralpiSalò players
Serie A players
Serie C players
Footballers from Sardinia